Teymur Pasha Khan was the sixth khan of the Maku Khanate from 1866 to 1895.

References

People from Maku, Iran
Maku Khanate
19th-century monarchs of Persia
Year of birth unknown
Year of death unknown